The Moody Boys or Moody Boyz are Tony Thorpe's UK-based record production and remix outfit, active since 1988.

The Moody Boys were closely linked with The KLF - and in particular with KLF member Jimmy Cauty - until the KLF's retirement in 1992, but it is not known whether Cauty was ever officially a member of the Moody Boys or merely a close collaborator.

History
According to AllMusic, "Moody Boyz" is the "nom de plume of producer Tony Thorpe (both solo and with occasional collaborators)".

Beginning in 1988 with the single "Acid Rappin'", the Moody Boys produced dance music that incorporated elements of techno, dub, acid house, hip hop, drum and bass and African music. Their 1991 single "Funky Zulu" is considered a house classic. The Moody Boys' original releases were complemented by duties as the "in-house" remixers of The KLF's hit singles "3 a.m. Eternal", "What Time Is Love?" and "Last Train to Trancentral".  In each case, The Moody Boys' mixes were released on separate 12"s to the charting singles, in 1990 and 1991. The KLF co-produced the Moody Boys' "First National Rapper" in 1988 (as "The JAMs") and remixed "What Is Dub?" in 1991. Thorpe is also a credited as an "additional performer" on the KLF's The White Room album.

Vice and DJ Mag claim that Jimmy Cauty was actually a member of the Moody Boys, whereas AllMusic attributes the project to Thorpe and "occasional collaborators". Tracks produced by "Tony Thorpe and Jimmy Cauty" were credited separately to tracks produced by "The Moody Boys" on the 1991 single "Lion Dance", and a 1994 interview with Thorpe and a companion discography state that "Journey Into Dubland" was made with Jimmy Cauty, suggesting Cauty was just a collaborator. The Moody Boys recorded a Peel Session in 1991 without Cauty; programming duties were handled by Thorpe and another close associate of the KLF, Nick Coler.

Cauty and his KLF-partner Bill Drummond retired from the music industry in 1992, but Thorpe continued under the revised "Moody Boyz" moniker until 1994, producing in this time what is considered to be the Moody name's best work, including another "classic", "Destination Africa", and the album, Product of the Environment. A remixed version, Recycled for the Environment, was also released to acclaim. featuring contributions from many remixers, including Andrew Weatherall and Dave Hedger.

Reviews
Allmusic awarded Product of the Environment 4 stars (out of 5), dubbing the album "a visionary collection of subtly innovative techno and tribal house, with heaps of African and Caribbean influences".

In awarding Recycled for the Environment 4 stars (again, out of 5), Allmusic said, "styles range from lush tribal techno to murky ambient and spacy electro, each offering an inspired extrapolation of Thorpe's originals.".

Selected discography

Singles

Albums

Remixes

References

External links

The Moody Boys discography at Discogs

The KLF
British electronic musicians
Remixers